Sankt Johann-Köppling is a former municipality in the district of Voitsberg in the Austrian state of Styria. Since the 2015 Styria municipal structural reform, it is part of the municipality Söding-Sankt Johann.

Geography
The municipality lies southwest of Graz.

References

Cities and towns in Voitsberg District